Guitar Player is a compilation album by jazz guitarist Tal Farlow that was released by Prestige in 1974. Liner notes were written by Jim Crocket, publisher and editor of Guitar Player magazine.

Tracks
Side 1
 "Who Cares?" (George Gershwin, Ira Gershwin)
 "Let's Fall in Love (Harold Arlen, Ted Koehler)
 "Old Devil Moon" (Burton Lane, E.Y. Harburg)
 "Cabin in the Sky" (Vernon Duke, John La Touche)
 "How Am I to Know?" (Jack King, Dorothy Parker)

Side 2
 "That Old Black Magic" (Harold Arlen, Johnny Mercer)
 "What Is This Thing Called Love?" (Cole Porter)
 "I Brung You Finjans for Your Zarf" (Tal Farlow, Red Norvo)
 "My Funny Valentine" (Richard Rodgers, Lorenz Hart)
 "Lullaby of Birdland" (George Shearing)

Side 3
 "Straight, No Chaser" (Thelonious Monk)
 "Darn That Dream" (Jimmy Van Heusen, Eddie DeLange)
 "Summertime" (George Gershwin, DuBose Heyward)
 "Sometime Ago" (Sergio Mihanovich)

Side 4
 "I'll Remember April" (Gene de Paul, Patricia Johnston, Don Raye)
 "My Romance" (Richard Rodgers, Lorenz Hart)
 "Crazy She Calls Me" (Carl Sigman, Bob Russell)

References

1974 albums
Tal Farlow albums